The Macedonian Scientific and Literary Society, called also Slavic-Macedonian Scholarly and Literary Society was an organization of Macedonian Slavs in Russia in the first decades of the twentieth century.

Activity 

Its founders were Dimitrija Čupovski and his brother Nace Dimov. Other founders include Stefan Dedov and Dijamandija Mišajkov. The organization's secretary was Milan Stoilov, a medical student in Saint Petersburg, until his death in 1903. , another founding member, served as its librarian.

The Macedonian Literary and Scientific Society was the most prominent society of the Macedonians abroad. It was established in Saint Petersburg on 28 October 1902 and was presided over by Čupovski. As part of its scholarly and literary activities, the society supported the introduction of Macedonian as its official language.  Its aim was the creation of an independent Macedonia, encompassing the entire geographic region of Macedonia, according to maps drawn by the society itself. 

Its member Krste Misirkov published the first book in a precursor of the modern Macedonian literary language (Za Makedonskite Raboti - On Macedonian Matters) in 1903. The book was published in the central dialects of Macedonia, which would later form the core of the Macedonian literary language, as proposed in the book itself. The book also used a modified Cyrillic script which served as a basis for standardization of the Macedonian alphabet. By April 1903, its members reached 25, but only the names of 19 founders are known.

In 1905 the Society published Vardar, the first scholarly, scientific and literary journal in the central dialects of Macedonia, which later would contribute in the standardization of Macedonian, while in 1913 it produced the first ethnic and geographic map of Macedonia. In addition it published the journal "Makedonskij Golos" (Macedonian Voice) in Russian. 

Towards the end of 1905, the society was dissolved, and from 1912 it reappeared, but its activity ended in 1917 with the October Revolution in Russia. This scholarly institution with its literary and national cultural activity is considered the foundation upon which the history of the modern Macedonian Academy of Arts and Sciences was built upon.

See also 
 Macedonian nationalism
 On Macedonian Matters
 Memorandum of Independence of Macedonia (1913)

References

External links 
 "Macedonian Voice" - third edition on Commons.
 "Macedonian Voice" - second edition on Commons.
 "Macedonian Voice" - first edition on Commons.
 Makedononskiy golos - scans from the original first edition of the magazine.
 Magazine "Vardar"

History of North Macedonia
Macedonian nationalism
Organizations established in 1902
Macedonian Scientific and Literary Society